Immaculate Conception High School may refer to:

Jamaica 
 Immaculate Conception High School (Jamaica)

United States 
IC Catholic Prep (Elmhurst, Illinois), Elmhurst, Illinois
Immaculate Conception Ukrainian Catholic High School, Warren, Michigan
Immaculate Conception High School (Massachusetts), Revere, Massachusetts
Immaculate Conception High School (Mississippi), Clarksdale, Mississippi
Immaculate Conception High School (Lodi, New Jersey), Lodi, New Jersey
Immaculate Conception High School (Montclair, New Jersey), Montclair, New Jersey
Immaculate Conception High School (Celina, Ohio), Celina, Ohio
Immaculate Conception High School (Tennessee), Memphis, Tennessee